Judy Manning (born October 24, 1942, in Atlanta, Georgia) is a former member of the House of Representatives in the U.S. state of Georgia.  Manning is a Republican and represented District 34, which encompasses parts of Cobb County. She is married to Aymar Manning and has two grown children and three grandchildren.

References

Republican Party members of the Georgia House of Representatives
Living people
1942 births
Women state legislators in Georgia (U.S. state)
21st-century American politicians
21st-century American women politicians